Karl-Günther Bechem (alias: "Bernhard Nacke") (21 December 1921 – 3 May 2011) was a racing driver from Germany.

Bechem started out in sports car racing before competing in Formula Two in the 1952 German Grand Prix, driving a BMW under the alias "Bernhard Nacke". He failed to finish the race, and so did not score any World Championship points. He continued driving an ex-Karl Gommann AFM-BMW (chassis 50–5) in Formula Two in 1953, at AVUS and then in the German Grand Prix at Nürburgring, again failing to finish.  He was more successful in sports car racing with the Borgward team.

In 1954 Bechem crashed heavily while competing in the Carrera Panamericana, and although he recovered fully from his injuries, he never raced again at this high level.

Complete World Championship results
(key)

Sources
Profile at www.grandprix.com

1921 births
2011 deaths
German racing drivers
German Formula One drivers
AFM Formula One drivers
Carrera Panamericana drivers